Buruny is a rural locality (a settlement) and the administrative center of Astrakhansky Selsoviet, Narimanovsky District, Astrakhan Oblast, Russia. The population was 2,147 as of 2010. There are 20 streets.

Geography 
Buruny is located 117 km southwest of Narimanov (the district's administrative centre) by road. Razyezd 3 is the nearest rural locality.

References 

Rural localities in Narimanovsky District